Nikolaj Hagelskjær Pedersen (born 6 May 1990) is a Danish professional footballer who plays for Middelfart G&BK in the Danish 2nd Division, as a defender.

Career
Hagelskjær has played for Vejle Boldklub, Stjarnan, FC Fredericia and Esbjerg fB.

References

External links

1990 births
Living people
Danish men's footballers
Vejle Boldklub players
Stjarnan players
FC Fredericia players
Esbjerg fB players
Danish 1st Division players
Úrvalsdeild karla (football) players
Danish Superliga players
Association football defenders
Danish expatriate men's footballers
Danish expatriate sportspeople in Iceland
Expatriate footballers in Iceland
Middelfart Boldklub players